The Battle of Cynwit  was a battle between West Saxons and Vikings in 878 at a fort which Asser calls Cynwit. The location of the battle is not known for sure but probably was at Countisbury Hill, near Countisbury, Devon.

Prelude
The Viking army, by tradition, led by Ubba  brother of Ivar the Boneless and Halfdan Ragnarsson. Sailed from Dyfed (where they had overwintered) and  landed on the coast at Countisbury with 23 ships and twelve hundred men. On landing the Viking army discovered that the West Saxons had taken refuge in a stronghold at Cynuit (Countisbury?), they perceived that the stronghold was unprepared for battle and decided to besiege it instead, particularly as the stronghold did not seem to have any food or water supply.

The battle
According to Asser  (Alfred's biographer) the West Saxons burst out of the fortress, one day, at dawn and were able to overwhelm the Viking forces killing their leader and over eight hundred of his men. They also captured the fabled "Raven banner".The Anglo Saxon Chronicle reported it thus:

Aftermath
At the time of the battle Alfred the Great was on the run from the Vikings in the marshes of Somerset. It was therefore an important victory for the West Saxons won by someone other than Alfred, the king of Wessex who at the time was spearheading the West Saxon resistance to the Viking invasions. The Chronicle, in addressing the year 878, makes the claim that "all but Alfred the King" had been subdued by the Vikings:

The Battle of Cynwit was one of several triumphant stories, recorded by Asser and the Chronicle, for 878 that culminated in victory over the Vikings at the Battle of Edington.

The battle in fiction
The battle appears in The Marsh King, a children's historical novel by C. Walter Hodges, where its location is called "Kynwit". Although this novel is about King Alfred, it gives due credit to Ealdorman Odda for this victory, although the description of the battle may not be very accurate, showing the Vikings as making a landing at night and being defeated immediately on the landing ground.

The battle also features in Bernard Cornwell's novel The Last Kingdom. Cornwell ascribes the victory, as well as the killing of Ubba, to his hero Uhtred, though he is supported by forces commanded by Odda.

The battle is featured in BBC's and Netflix's original show The Last Kingdom. Like the novel that the show is based on, the battle culminates with the show's protagonist, Uhtred of Bebbanburg, slaying the Viking warlord Ubba in a duel, before Odda's reinforcements arrive to continue and ultimately win the battle.

Notes

Citations

References

Further reading

Early sources

Cynwit
Cynwit
Cynwit
Cynwit
878
9th century in England